Freylinia crispa is a flowering plant in the figwort family.

References

crispa